was a large minelayer of the Imperial Japanese Navy that was in service during the early stages of World War II. She was named after the Tsugaru Peninsula in northwest Aomori Prefecture of Japan. She was commissioned immediately before the start of World War II, and sunk by the American submarine USS Darter in June 1944.

Building
In addition to carrying 600 Type 6 naval mines, the new ship was equipped with an aircraft catapult, and carried a Kawanishi E7K reconnaissance seaplane. Physically very similar to Okinoshima in size, appearance and layout, its main armament was changed to four 127 mm Type 89 dual purpose guns, intended to give Tsugaru better AA capabilities than its predecessor.

Tsugaru was launched by the Yokosuka Naval Arsenal on 5 June 1940, and was commissioned into service on 22 October 1941.

Operational history
After commissioning, Tsugaru was assigned to Admiral Kiyohide Shima’s Mine Division 19 under Admiral Shigeyoshi Inoue’s IJN 4th Fleet and was forward deployed to Saipan. 
At the time of the attack on Pearl Harbor in December 1941, Tsugaru was assigned to support the invasion of Guam. Following the success of this mission, in January 1942,  Tsugaru deployed from Jaluit together with Okinoshima, under the overall command of Admiral Sadamichi Kajioka to participate in “Operation R” (the invasion of Rabaul and Kavieng).

On 5 March, Tsugaru and Okinoshima, under the overall command of Admiral Kuninori Marumo, were assigned to “Operation SR” (the invasion of Lae and Salamaua in New Guinea).

On 4 May Tsugaru was assigned to Admiral Shima's Tulagi invasion force, which was part of “Operation Mo” (the invasion of Tulagi and Port Moresby in New Guinea). However, the invasion plans were cancelled after the Battle of the Coral Sea and Tsugaru was assigned instead to “Operation RY" (the invasion of Nauru and Ocean Island). This operation was also cancelled after the loss of Okinoshima on 12 May 1942, and Tsugaru was stationed at Rabaul.

On 14 July, Tsugaru was reassigned to Admiral Gunichi Mikawa’s IJN 8th Fleet, and supported “Operation RI” (the invasion of Buna in New Guinea). Subsequently, in August and September, Tsugaru was used on missions to supply reinforcements and equipment to Guadalcanal, and was hit by bombs from USAAF B-17 Flying Fortress bombers on 3 September, with 14 crewmen killed and 30 wounded. After repairs, she continued making transport runs to Guadalcanal, Shortland Island, New Georgia and Santa Isabel Island in the Solomon Islands to the end of February 1943.

From March–May 1943, Tsugaru underwent repairs and refit at Yokosuka Naval Arsenal, returning to Rabaul in early August. The damage was enough to warrant an immediate return to Truk for emergency repairs, and a return to Yokosuka by mid-September, where she remained to the end of the year.

On 1 December 1943, Tsugaru was reassigned to the Third Southern Expeditionary Fleet. On 24 March 1944, she deployed from Palau to mine the Balabac Strait in the Philippines, after which she was stationed at Balikpapan in Borneo. On 31 May, Tsugaru was assigned to “Operation KON” (the Relief of Biak), transporting reinforcements from Zamboanga on Mindanao in an effort to counter the American landings. On 21 June, after departing Sorong, New Guinea for Halmahera Island, Tsugaru was torpedoed by the Royal Dutch Navy submarine K-XIV, which caused severe damage. Two hit Tsugaru, which sank at position  less than 25 minutes later with loss of most of her crew, including her CO, Captain Nakatsu.
Tsugaru was removed from the navy list on 10 August 1944.

References

Notes

Books

External links

Minelayers of the Imperial Japanese Navy
World War II mine warfare vessels of Japan
Ships built by Yokosuka Naval Arsenal
1940 ships
Maritime incidents in June 1944
World War II shipwrecks in the Molucca Sea
Ships sunk by American submarines